William LaBarthe Steele (May 2, 1875 – March 4, 1949) was an American architect from Chicago, Illinois. He is considered a principal member of the Prairie School Architectural Movement during the early 20th century.

Career 
After graduating from the University of Illinois, Steele worked under renowned architect Louis Sullivan in Chicago, Illinois from 1897 to 1900. He later moved to Pittsburgh, Pennsylvania where he worked at several firms.

In 1904, he settled in Sioux City, Iowa, where he stayed for 25 years until moving to Omaha, Nebraska in 1929. Around this time, he and Thomas Rogers Kimball founded an architectural firm that eventually became Steele, Sandham, and Steele. He designed over 250 commercial buildings, churches, synagogues, homes, schools, and government buildings in Iowa, Nebraska, South Dakota, and Minnesota.

The Woodbury County Courthouse in Sioux City is considered to be a premier example of Prairie School aesthetics, which he developed along with Minneapolis-based architects George Grant Elmslie and William Gray Purcell. All three men had previously worked for Sullivan in various roles. The Courthouse, along with Walthill Hospital in Nebraska (1912), are both designated National Historic Landmarks. Over 20 of his surviving works are on the National Register of Historic Places (NrHP).

Steele was one of the founding members of The Nebraska State Board of Examiners for Professional Engineers and Architects (now known as the Nebraska Board of Engineers and Architects). He served on the Board from 1937 to 1942.

Selected works 
Sioux County Courthouse (Orange City, Iowa) (1902–04), designed by architect Wilfred W. Beach; Steele worked as a draftsman on the project before it ended, and later partnered briefly with Beach.  NRHP-listed.
Florence Crittenton Home (1906), 1105-1111 28th St., Sioux City, IA Beach & Steele, formerly NRHP-listed
Dr. Susan LaFlesche Picotte Memorial Hospital (1912), 505 Matthewson St., Walthill, NE Steele, William, NRHP-listed
Davidson Building (1913), 505 6th St., Sioux City, IA Steele, William LaBarthe, NRHP-listed
St. Patrick's Catholic Church, Cedar (1915), 4 mi. W of Churdan on E 19, .5 mi. N on gravel rd., Churdan, IA Steele, William LeBarthe, NRHP-listed
St. Casimir Lithuanian Roman Catholic Church (1915), Sioux City, IA, since demolished.
H.H. Everist House (1916–17), 37 McDonald Dr., Sioux City, IA Steele, William LaBarthe, NRHP-listed
Woodbury County Courthouse (1916–18) designed by George Grant Elmslie in collaboration with the Sioux City architect William L. Steele and Elmslie's partner, William Gray Purcell, a National Historic Landmark
First Congregational Church, Former (Sioux City, Iowa) (1916–18), aka Sioux City Baptist Church, 1301 Nebraska Ave., Sioux City, IA Steele, William, NRHP-listed
Hawarden City Hall, Fire Station and Auditorium (1918), 715 Central Ave., Hawarden, IA Steele, William La Barthe, NRHP-listed
Charles Mix County Courthouse (1918), Main St. between Fourth and Fifth Sts., Lake Andes, SD Steele, William L., NRHP-listed
Sacred Heart Hospital (1921), 110 6th Ave. NE, Le Mars, IA Steele, William LaBarthe, NRHP-listed
Sacred Heart Catholic Church (1921) 211 S. 13th St., Fort Dodge, IA, NRHP-listed
Hartington City Hall and Auditorium (1921–23), 101 N. Broadway, Hartington, NE Steele, William L., NRHP-listed
Mount Sinai Temple (1922 addition), 1320 Nebraska St., Sioux City, IA Steele, William L, NRHP-listed
Harold A. (H.A.) Doyle House (1924), 712 W. Third St., Yankton, SD Steele, William L., NRHP-listed
Holy Trinity Greek Orthodox Church (1925), 900 6th St., Sioux City, IA Steele, William L., NRHP-listed
Sioux City Fire Station Number 3 (1929), NRHP-listed.  Local lore suggests Steele was the architect.
Williges Building (1930), 613-615 Pierce St., Sioux City, IA Steele & Hilgers, NRHP-listed.  Steele's last work in Sioux City
Ben and Harriet Schulein House, 2604 Jackson St., Sioux City, IA Steele, William LaBarthe, NRHP-listed
Sioux City Public Library (Smith Villa Branch), 1509 George Ave., Sioux City, IA Steele, William, NRHP-listed
Sts. Peter & Paul School, Jct. of 2nd and Broadway Sts., SE corner, Butte, NE Steele, William L., NRHP-listed
St. Rose of Lima Catholic Church and School Complex, 1302-1316 S 5th St, Crofton, NE Steele, William L., NRHP-listed 
One or more buildings in the W.L. and Winnie (Woodfield) Belfrage Farmstead Historic District, NRHP-listed 
One or more works in Foster Park Historic District, 500-900 blks. Central Ave. S. & blocks around Foster Park, Le Mars, IA Steele, William La Barthe, NRHP-listed
One or more works in Le Mars Downtown Commercial Historic District, Bounded by 2nd St., N, 2nd Ave., W., 1st St., S., & 1st Ave., E., Le Mars, IA Steele & Hilgers; Beuttler, William, NRHP-listed 
St. Boniface Catholic Church (Sioux City, Iowa), which is a major part of the St. Boniface Historic District, 703 W. 5th St., 515 Cook St., 700 W. 6th St., Sioux City, IA Steele, William LaBarthe, NRHP-listed
James P. Newton House and Maid Cottage, 2312 Nebraska St., Sioux City, IA Steele, William I., NRHP-listed (and this is an inbound link, and L. vs. I. fix noted at wp:NRIS info issues IA)
Sioux City Public Library-North Side Branch, 810 29th St., Sioux City, IA Steele, William I., NRHP-listed (and this has inbound link, and L. vs. I. fix noted at wp:NRIS info issues IA)

Other
Architect Knute E. Westerlind, a protégé of Steele's, designed the PWA Moderne Sioux City Municipal Auditorium in 1938.

See also 
Cathedral of the Epiphany (Sioux City, Iowa)  (not NRIS)
Federal Office Building (Omaha, Nebraska)
IVY Hotel + Residences
List of Greek Orthodox churches in the United States
Sioux City Free Public Library
Sioux City Public Library (Smith Villa Branch)
T.S. Martin and Company

References

Architects from Iowa
1875 births
1949 deaths
People from Sioux City, Iowa
University of Illinois Urbana-Champaign alumni
20th-century American architects
Architects from Nebraska
People from Omaha, Nebraska